The Captain's Journey is the sixth studio album by guitarist Lee Ritenour, released in 1978 by Elektra Records.

Track listing

Personnel

 Lee Ritenour – guitar, guitar synthesizer, rhythm arrangement (except track 2)
 Dave Grusin – synthesizer (tracks 1, 3), Minimoog (tracks 1, 3, 5), Rhodes piano (tracks 2, 7), electric grand piano (tracks 5, 6), piano (tracks 3, 4, 7), percussion (tracks 6, 7), rhythm arrangement (track 2), strings arrangement, flute arrangement
 Ernie Watts – tenor and soprano saxophone
 Ray Beckstein – flute (track 7)
 Eddie Daniels – flute (track 7)
 Dave Valentin – flute (track 7)
 David Foster – Rhodes piano (track 4), piano (track 2), rhythm arrangement (track 2)
 Don Grusin – piano (track 5)
 Patrice Rushen – Rhodes piano (track 1), electric grand piano (track 1)
 Ian Underwood – synthesizer (track 1)
 Jay Graydon – guitar (tracks 2, 4)
 Mitch Holder – guitar (tracks 3, 6)
 Anthony Jackson – bass guitar (track 1)
 Abraham Laboriel – bass guitar
 Steve Gadd – drums (except track 3)
 Alex Acuña – drums (track 3), percussion (tracks 1, 3)
 Paulinho da Costa – percussion (tracks 3, 5, 6)
 Sue Evans – percussion (tracks 4–7)
 Steve Forman – percussion (tracks 1, 3)
 Larry Rosen – percussion (track 7)
 Steve Thornton – percussion (track 4)
 Patti Austin – vocals (track 6)
 Tom Baylor – vocals (track 6)
 Bill Champlin – vocals (track 2), vocal arrangement (track 2)
 Venette Gloud – backing vocals (track 2)
 Carmen Twillie – backing vocals (track 2)
 David Nadien – strings
 Ed Walsh – programming

Production
 Lee Ritenour – producer
 Dave Grusin – producer
 Peter Chaiken – engineering
 Dennis Digher – engineering
 Neil Dorfsman – engineering
 Chris Gordon – engineering
 Larry Rosen – engineering
 Howard Steele – engineering
 Linda Tyler – engineering
 Tommy Vicari – engineering
 Joe Gastwirt – mastering

References

Lee Ritenour albums
1978 albums
albums produced by Dave Grusin
Elektra Records albums